All of It is the third studio album by American country music singer Cole Swindell. It was released on August 17, 2018 via Warner Bros. Records Nashville. The album includes the singles "Break Up in the End" and "Love You Too Late" as well as several songs written by Swindell, Michael Carter, and outside writers.

Content
"Break Up in the End" is the album's lead single. It has charted on both the US Billboard Hot Country Songs and Country Airplay charts in advance of the album's release. The album's second single, "Love You Too Late", was released to country radio on November 19, 2018. The album features twelve songs in total, of which Swindell co-wrote five. Two other cuts, "Somebody's Been Drinkin'" and "The Ones Who Got Me Here", were also released digitally in advance of the album. He will also tour on the headlining All of It Tour, which begins in St. Louis, Missouri on the day of the album's release.

Of the album's title track, Swindell told the website Sounds Like Nashville that the song was chosen as the title track "because I think the album is full of every topic we could touch on."

Critical reception
Rating it 3.5 out of 4 stars, Newsday said that the album consists of songs that are "celebrating regular life with thrilling results." He praised the lyrics of "Reason to Drink", "The Ones That Got Me Here", and "Dad's Old Number" in particular. Annie Reuter of Sounds Like Nashville also praised the songwriting, and said of the album as a whole, "Whether he wrote the song or not, his emotive singing shines through, leaving a lasting impression on the listener. And, with a proven track record at radio in selecting songs that leave an impact, All of It adds to Swindell's growing catalog of hits."

Commercial performance
All of It debuted at number seven on the US Billboard 200 with 50,000 album-equivalent units, of which 39,000 were pure album sales. It is Swindell's third top 10 album. As of October 2019, the album has sold 104,500 copies in the United States.

Track listing

Personnel
Mike Brignardello - bass guitar
Pat Buchanan - electric guitar
Michael Carter - electric guitar, keyboards, piano, programming
Dave Cohen - Hammond B-3 organ, keyboards, piano, synthesizer
Joel Key - banjo, acoustic guitar
Miles McPherson - drums
James Mitchell - electric guitar
Greg Morrow - drums
Billy Panda - acoustic guitar
Cole Swindell - lead vocals
Russell Terrell - background vocals
Mike Wolofsky - bass guitar

Charts

Weekly charts

Year-end charts

References

2018 albums
Cole Swindell albums
Warner Records albums